The 49th World Science Fiction Convention (Worldcon), also known as Chicon V, was held on 29 August–2 September 1991 at the Hyatt Regency Chicago in Chicago, Illinois, United States.

The convention was chaired by Kathleen Meyer.

Participants 

Attendance was 5,661.

Guests of Honor 

 Hal Clement (pro)
 Martin H. Greenberg (pro)
 Richard Powers (pro)
 Jon & Joni Stopa (fan)
 Marta Randall (toastmaster)

Other notable program participants 

Other participants included author Clive Barker and Timothy Leary.

Awards

1991 Hugo Awards 

 Best Novel: The Vor Game by Lois McMaster Bujold
 Best Novella: "The Hemingway Hoax" by Joe Haldeman
 Best Novelette: "The Manamouki" by Mike Resnick
 Best Short Story: "Bears Discover Fire" by Terry Bisson
 Best Non-Fiction Book: How to Write Science Fiction and Fantasy by Orson Scott Card
 Best Dramatic Presentation: Edward Scissorhands
 Best Professional Editor: Gardner Dozois
 Best Professional Artist: Michael Whelan
 Best Semiprozine: Locus, edited by Charles N. Brown
 Best Fanzine: Lan's Lantern, edited by George Laskowski
 Best Fan Writer: Dave Langford
 Best Fan Artist: Teddy Harvia

Other awards 

 Special Award: Andrew I. Porter for many years of excellence in editing Science Fiction Chronicle
 Special Award: Elst Weinstein for starting up and continuing the Hugos
 John W. Campbell Award for Best New Writer: Julia Ecklar

See also 

 Hugo Award
 Science fiction
 Speculative fiction
 World Science Fiction Society
 Worldcon

References

External links 

  
 NESFA.org: The Long List
 NESFA.org: 1991 convention notes 
 Hugo.org: 1991 Hugo Awards

1991 conferences
1991 in Illinois
Culture of Chicago
Science fiction conventions in the United States
Worldcon